Florent Hasani (born 30 March 1997) is a Kosovan professional footballer who plays as an right winger for Albanian club Tirana and the Kosovo national team.

Club career

Early career and Trepça '89
Hasani was part of all youth teams of Vushtrria until December 2014, where he was promoted to the senior team with which he played 15 matches and scored a goal. On 20 June 2015, Hasani joined Football Superleague of Kosovo side Trepça '89.

Diósgyőr
On 25 January 2018, Hasani joined as free transfer to Nemzeti Bajnokság I club Diósgyőr. Four days later, the club confirmed that Hasani's transfer was permanent. On 20 February 2018, he made his debut with Diósgyőr in the 2017–18 Magyar Kupa round of 16 against Vác after being named in the starting line-up.

Hapoel Kfar Saba
On 10 February 2021, Hasani signed a one-and-a-half year contract with Israeli Premier League club Hapoel Kfar Saba. Nine days later, he made his debut with Hapoel Kfar Saba in the 2020–21 Israel State Cup eighth round against Kafr Qasim after being named in the starting line-up.

Gyirmót
On 23 June 2021, Hasani signed a two-year contract with the newly promoted Nemzeti Bajnokság I club Gyirmót. On 30 July 2021, he made his debut in a 1–1 home draw against MTK Budapest after coming on as a substitute at 85th minute in place of Kristóf Herjeczki.

International career

Under-21
On 21 March 2017, Hasani received a call-up from Kosovo U21 for a 2019 UEFA European Under-21 Championship qualification match against Republic of Ireland U21, and made his debut after being named in the starting line-up.

Senior
On 22 January 2018, Hasani received his first call-up from national senior team in a friendly match against Azerbaijan. The match however was cancelled two days later, which prolonged his debut. His debut with Kosovo came on 10 September 2019 in the UEFA Euro 2020 qualifying match against England after coming on as a substitute at 85th minute in place of Valon Berisha. One month after debut, Hasani scored his first goal for Kosovo in his second appearance for the country in a 1–0 home minimal win over Gibraltar.

Career statistics

Club

International

International goals
Scores and results list Kosovo's goal tally first.

References

External links

1997 births
Living people
Sportspeople from Vushtrri
Kosovan footballers
Kosovo youth international footballers
Kosovo under-21 international footballers
Kosovo international footballers
Kosovan expatriate footballers
Kosovan expatriate sportspeople in Hungary
Kosovan expatriate sportspeople in Israel
Association football wingers
Football Superleague of Kosovo players
KF Vushtrria players
KF Trepça'89 players
Nemzeti Bajnokság I players
Diósgyőri VTK players
Gyirmót FC Győr players
Israeli Premier League players
Hapoel Kfar Saba F.C. players